D.I.B. Anderson Farm, also known as the D.I.B. Anderson House and Chauncey M. Price House, is a historic home located in Morgantown, Monongalia County, West Virginia. It was built about 1866, and is a two-story, asymmetrical brick farmhouse in a vernacular Italianate style.  It features a one-story front porch and a second story "sleeping porch."  Also on the property is a contributing ice house and summer kitchen building built of hand made bricks, and a cut sandstone well house.

It was listed on the National Register of Historic Places in 1994.

References

Houses on the National Register of Historic Places in West Virginia
Italianate architecture in West Virginia
Houses completed in 1866
Houses in Morgantown, West Virginia
National Register of Historic Places in Monongalia County, West Virginia
1866 establishments in West Virginia